The National Metropolitan Bank Building is an historic structure located at 655 15th Street, NW in Downtown Washington, D.C.

History
B. Stanley Simmons  of the architectural firm of Gordon, Tracy & Swartout designed the Beaux-Arts style building.   It was built from 1905 to 1907.

It was listed on the National Register of Historic Places in 1978.

In 1986, its façade was incorporated into a new office building, 'Metropolitan Square', designed by Vlastimil Koubek and Skidmore, Owings & Merrill.

References

1907 establishments in Washington, D.C.
Commercial buildings completed in 1907
Beaux-Arts architecture in Washington, D.C.
Bank buildings on the National Register of Historic Places in Washington, D.C.